Lars Jakobsen (born 4 November 1961) is a Danish former football (soccer) player, who played for Odense Boldklub. He played four games and scored one goal for the Denmark national football team.

References

External links
Danish national team profile
Danish Superliga statistics

1961 births
Living people
Danish men's footballers
Denmark international footballers
Danish Superliga players
Odense Boldklub players
Association football forwards